Babol University of Medical Sciences (MUBabol) (Danushgah-e 'lum-e Pezeshki-ye Babel), is a medical sciences university in the city of Babol, Mazandaran Province, Iran.

It was founded as a school for laboratory technicians in 1962, and was elevated to university status in 1985.

It has more than 3700 enrolled students in all faculties. The university operates seven hospitals.

Schools
 Medical School (founded in 1992),
 Nursing and Midwifery School (founded 2017)
 Dental School (founded in 1993),
 Health School (founded 2018)
 Paramedical School (founded in 1962)
 Traditional Medicine School (founded 2016)
 Rehabilitation School (founded 2016)
 Nursing School (Ramsar)
 Health Research Institute  (founded 2016)

The dental faculty is one of only two schools in Iran that trains students for Dental Nursing Associate degrees.

Research Centers
 Cellular and Molecular Biology Research Center
 Non-Communicable Pediatric Disease Research Center
 Infertility and Reproductive Health Research Center
 Infectious Diseases and Tropical Medicine Research Center
 Dental Materials Research Center
 Social Determinants of Health Research Center
 Mobility Impairment Research Center
 Cancer Research Center
 Oral Health Research Center
 Traditional Medicine and History of Medical Sciences Research Center
 Nursing Care Research Center
 Neuroscience Research Center
 Immunoregulation Research Center

International Journals 
 Caspian Journal of Dental Research
 Caspian Journal of Internal Medicine
 Caspian Journal of Pediatric
 Caspian Journal of Reproductive Medicine
 Caspian Journal of Scientometrics
 Current Research in Medical Sciences
 International Journal Molecular & Cellular Medicine
 Journal of Babol Univ. of Med. Sci.

Governmental Hospitals
 Yahya Nezhad Hospital (1928)
 Amirkola Pediatric Hospital (1961)
 Beheshti Hospital (1985)
 Rouhani Hospital (2006)
 Rajaee Hospital (1985)
 Fatemeh Sahra Hospital (1996)
 17 Shahrivar Hospital (1986)

See also
Higher education in Iran

External links

Medical schools in Iran
Universities in Iran
Educational institutions established in 1962
Education in Mazandaran Province
Buildings and structures in Mazandaran Province
1962 establishments in Iran